Chu Tu'nan (August 18, 1899 – April 11, 1994) was a Chinese male politician, who served as a vice-chairperson of the Standing Committee of the 6th National People's Congress and the chairman of the China Democratic League.

References 

1899 births
1994 deaths
Chairpersons of the China Democratic League
Delegates to the 1st National People's Congress
Delegates to the 2nd National People's Congress
Delegates to the 3rd National People's Congress
Delegates to the 4th National People's Congress
Delegates to the 5th National People's Congress
Vice Chairpersons of the National People's Congress